Anthony J. Gallela is a game designer who has worked primarily on board games and role-playing games.

Career
Anthony J. Gallela was a co-producer for the ManaFest and KublaCon game conventions; a freelance writer for several industry publications; a game store manager; and a consultant and broker for several award-winning games. Gallela was a co-developer of the Theatrix roleplaying game (published by Backstage Press), and the co-designer (with Japji Khalsa) of the adventure game, Dwarven Dig! (from Kenzer & Company), which earned him an Origins Award nomination. Gallela has been the executive director of the Game Manufacturers Association.

References

External links
 

Board game designers
Living people
Place of birth missing (living people)
Role-playing game designers
Year of birth missing (living people)